Chise Takizawa (born 14 February 2001) is a Japanese professional footballer who plays as a midfielder for WE League club Sanfrecce Hiroshima Regina.

Club career 
Takizawa made her WE League debut on 12 September 2021.

References 

Living people
2001 births
Women's association football midfielders
WE League players
Japanese women's footballers
Association football people from Nagano Prefecture
AC Nagano Parceiro Ladies players